Laurie Evans can refer to:

 Laurie Evans (cricketer) (born 1987), English cricketer
 Laurie Evans (politician) (1933–2016), Canadian politician